Lari Williams (1940 – 27 February 2022) was a Nigerian actor, poet, and playwright known for his roles in soap operas such as The Village Headmaster, Ripples, and Mirror in the Sun. Williams was born in Nigeria in 1940. He died at his home in Ikom, Cross River State, on 27 February 2022, at the age of 81.

References

1940 births
2022 deaths
Nigerian male television actors
Nigerian dramatists and playwrights
Nigerian poets
People from Cross River State
20th-century Nigerian male actors